Darren Waters (born 14 August 1985) is a Welsh rugby union player. His position is flanker. Waters played for the Newport Gwent Dragons regional team having joined them from Pontypridd in May 2011. In June 2014 Waters joined London Welsh.

References

External links 
 Newport Gwent Dragons profile
 Pontypridd RFC profile

1985 births
Living people
Dragons RFC players
London Welsh RFC players
Newport RFC players
Pontypridd RFC players
Rugby union players from Beddau
Welsh rugby union players
Rugby union flankers